Stockholm 2022 was a bid by Stockholm with Åre and the Swedish Olympic Committee for the 2022 Winter Olympics. The bid was announced at November 11, 2013. The IOC will select the host city for the 2022 Winter Olympics at the 127th IOC Session in Kuala Lumpur, Malaysia on July 31, 2015. Stockholm previously hosted the 1912 Summer Olympics and hosted equestrian events at the 1956 Summer Olympics in Melbourne.

On 17 January 2014, the Moderate Party in Stockholm decided not to support the bid, and after that there is a clear majority in the city council against organising the games.

On 17 January 2014, Stockholm dropped a bid for 2022 Winter Olympics.

History

In summer 2013, the Swedish Olympic Committee (SOK) has expressed plans to submit an application for the 2022 Winter Olympics and the 2022 Winter Paralympics in the capital Stockholm. Four alpine skiing events will be held in Åre in northern Sweden. SOK has the support of the Swedish Sports Organization for the Disabled and Swedish Paralympic Committee and the Swedish Sports Confederation. Lena Adelsohn Liljeroth, Minister for Culture and Sports, has said that she finds it difficult to see a future Olympic games in Sweden. The president of the Swedish Olympic Committee Stefan Lindeberg thinks that Stockholm's size is perfect for the Winter Olympics and says the city already has the most of what is needed. According to calculations, a Swedish Olympic Games will costs approximately 15–20 billion SEK (€ 1.7–2.3 billion).

On October 1, 2013, investigator Jöran Hägglund indicated that it is entirely possible to host the Winter Olympics in Stockholm. Hägglund estimated the implementation budget to 9.79 billion SEK (€ 1.13 billion) and the investment budget to 2.5 billion SEK (€ 290 million). The games will be concentrated entirely in the Stockholm area, and only eight of the alpine events are planned to be held in Åre. He also said that five investments are necessary; a new track to bobsleigh, luge and skeleton, improve the vertical drop fairly much in Flottsbrobacken, a new ski jump, speed skating venue and a cross country venue. The infrastructure and other ice venues already exists in Stockholm. The reason for this cost cut is that the Swedish government does not want to support the games with big money (several 100 million euros). However the IOC requires the government to guarantee support for cost overruns etc. A more thorough investigation showed that the cost estimation was uncertain. IOC requirements would demand reconstruction of several existing arenas, adding VIP lounges for IOC members and separate ones for media, restaurant kitchens etc.

Previous bids
Stockholm hosted the 1912 Summer Olympics. Stockholm also hosted the Equestrian events in the 1956 Summer Olympics.

Stockholm bid to host the 2004 Summer Olympics but lost to Athens.

Previous bids by other Swedish cities

Gothenburg (with cities spread over Sweden) bid to host the 1984 Winter Olympics but lost to Sarajevo. Falun (with Åre) bid to host the 1988 and 1992 Winter Olympics but lost to Calgary and Albertville respectively.

Östersund bid to host the 1994, 1998 and 2002 Winter Olympics but lost to Lillehammer, Nagano and Salt Lake City respectively.

Future bids
Stockholm co-bidded for the 2026 with Åre, but lost out to Milan-Cortina d'Ampezzo, Italy.

Venues
List of proposed venues:

Competition venues

Non-sporting venues

Transportation
Stockholm is served by the Stockholm-Arlanda Airport, which has intercontinental flights. There will be air connections to Åre Östersund Airport around 90 km from Åre. There are suggestions to use an airfield at Järpen ( from Åre), which probably must be upgraded to be used for commercial passenger flights. Groups in large planes going to Åre will probably use the Trondheim Airport in Norway ( from Åre). There are train connections between Stockholm and Åre, needing around 6 hours.

References

2022 Winter Olympics bids
Sport in Stockholm
Olympic Games bids by Sweden